This is a list of seasons completed by the Denver Nuggets of the National Basketball Association (NBA). They have played for 49 seasons, 38 in the NBA and nine in the American Basketball Association (ABA). The 1976 ABA Finals appearance is their only appearance in a league final. As of the 2021–22 season, they have never reached an NBA Finals and only been to the Western Conference Finals four times (1978, 1985, 2009, 2020).

Seasons

References

 
seasons